Muttambalam is a neighbourhood of Kottayam city in Kottayam district in the state of Kerala, India.

References

Villages in Kottayam district